Rhipidoherpia is a genus of solenogasters, shell-less, worm-like, marine mollusks.

Species
 Rhipidoherpia copulobursata Salvini-Plawen, 1978

References

 Salvini-Plawen L v. (1978). Antarktische und subantarktische Solenogastres (eine Monographie: 1898-1974). Zoologica (Stuttgart) 128: 1-305

Solenogastres